Jack Harrison may refer to:
Jack Harrison (American football) (1875–1952), American football coach and player
Jack Harrison (boxer) (1888–1970), English boxer
Jack Harrison (VC) (1890–1917), English recipient of the Victoria Cross in the First World War and rugby league player
Jack Harrison (footballer, born 1900) (1900–1982), Australian rules footballer for Essendon
Jack Harrison (RAF officer) (1912–2010), Scottish pilot in the Second World War and participant in the Great Escape
Jack Harrison (Australian footballer) (1915–1989), Australian rules footballer for Melbourne and North Melbourne
Jack Harrison (footballer, born 1916) (1916–?), English footballer
Jack Harrison (cricketer) (born 1995), English cricketer
Jack Harrison (footballer, born 1996), English footballer
Jack Harrison, character in the British TV series Hotel Babylon

See also
John Harrison (disambiguation)